William Jewett Tenney (1814 at Newport, Rhode Island – 20 September 1883, at Newark, New Jersey) was an American author, editor and encyclopedist.

Life

Graduating from Yale University in 1832 he studied medicine, but abandoned it for the law and, on being admitted to the bar, opened an office in New York. He then tried journalism on the editorial staff of the Journal of Commerce, and contributed editorially to the Evening Post, during 1841-43 and 1847-48.

In 1853 he entered the service of D. Appleton and Co., publishers, as editor, and, in addition to a large amount of literary and critical work, began for them, in 1861, the compilation of the Annual Cyclopædia which he continued till his death.

During a long residence at Elizabeth, New Jersey, he held several local public offices including that of collector of the port during President James Buchanan's administration. He became a convert to the Catholic faith and married, as his second wife, Sarah Brownson, daughter of Orestes A. Brownson.

Works

He indexed T. H. Benton's "Abridgment of the Debates of Congress" and added a sixteenth volume to the series (New York 1857-60). He edited the "Queens of England" (1852); and wrote a "Military and Naval History of the Rebellion in the U. S." (1865), and a "Grammatical Analysis" (1866).

Notes

References
 The entry cites:
 
 

1814 births
1883 deaths
American editors
Writers from Elizabeth, New Jersey
American naval historians
American male non-fiction writers
Yale University alumni
Historians from New Jersey